Balázs Hoksary (born 22 November 1902 – 13 February 1988) was a Romanian football defender and manager.

International career
Balázs Hoksary played five games at international level for Romania, making his debut in a friendly which ended with a 3–1 victory against Turkey.

Honours

Player
Chinezul Timișoara
Divizia A: 1921–22, 1922–23, 1923–24, 1924–25, 1925–26, 1926–27
Ripensia Timișoara
Divizia A: 1932–33, 1934–35, 1935–36
Cupa României: 1933–34, 1935–36, runner-up 1934–35, 1936–37

Manager
CFR Timișoara
Divizia A runner-up: 1947–48
Cupa României runner-up: 1947–48

Notes

References

External links
Balázs Hoksary at Labtof.ro

1902 births
1988 deaths
Romanian footballers
Romania international footballers
Association football defenders
Liga I players
Liga III players
FC Ripensia Timișoara players
Romanian football managers
Sportspeople from Arad, Romania